The western water-holding frog (Ranoidea occidentalis) is a species of frog that is endemic to Australia. The specific epithet occidentalis refers to its distribution in the western part of the continent.

Description
The species is large and robust. Colouration varies from grey to dark brown. The eyes are perched on top of the flat head, which has a large mouth. The limbs are short, with webbed toes. The mating call is a low waah waah waah..., uttered 80 times a minute.

Behaviour
The species breeds in temporary water bodies, mainly in the arid zone. The frog can aestivate for months in a burrow while conditions are dry, shedding its skin to form a cocoon, until cyclonic rains fill depressions in the landscape and trigger breeding activity. The females lay large masses of up to 500 eggs.

Distribution and habitat
The species has a wide distribution in arid and semi-arid parts of central Western Australia, southwards from Karratha to Kalgoorlie and eastwards from the west coast to the Canning Stock Route and Mavis Rock.

Photos

References

 
Ranoidea (genus)
Amphibians of Western Australia
Amphibians described in 2016
Frogs of Australia